In some communities of Spain, minor local entity is a territorial entity of scope smaller than municipality defined and regulated by the regional governments.

Some examples are caseríos, parroquias, aldeas, barrios, anteiglesias, concejos, pedanías, lugares anejos, decentralised municipal entity ( in Catalonia, autonomous local entity in Andalucía, rural parish in  Asturias. 

The administration of these entities have various names including an open council, a single person mayor called Alcalde pedáneo and a rural council and councils of Álava.

See also
 Local government in Spain

References

Bibliography
 

Subdivisions of Spain